Homoeoprepes is a genus of moths of the family Elachistidae.

Species
Homoeoprepes felisae Clarke, 1962
Homoeoprepes sympatrica Clarke, 1962
Homoeoprepes trochiloides Walsingham, 1909

References

 
Parametriotinae